KRFS may refer to:

 KRFS (AM), a radio station (1600 AM) licensed to serve Superior, Nebraska, United States
 KRFS-FM, a radio station (103.9 FM) licensed to serve Superior, Nebraska